Ghadhasaru Lake  or  Gadasru Mahadev Lake (alternatively spelled as Gandasaru or Gadasaru)   is a high altitude lake located  near Devikothi village of the Churah tehsil of Chamba district in Himachal Pradesh, India at an elevation of about  above the sea level at the base of mountain Gadasaru Peak. The lake is held sacred by the locals and has a circumference of about 1 km.

History 
Near the lake there is a small temple of Goddess Kali. 
Nearby Mahakali Lake is considered sacred to Goddess Mahakali.

References

External links
Himachal Pradesh Tourism Department

Lakes of Himachal Pradesh
Geography of Chamba district
Sacred lakes of India